Bradley Reed Sorenson (born February 5, 1986) is an American professional stock car racing driver and spotter. He last competed part-time in the NASCAR Cup Series, driving the No. 27 Chevrolet Camaro ZL1 1LE for Premium Motorsports, the Nos. 74/77 Camaro for Spire Motorsports, and the No. 7 Camaro for Tommy Baldwin Racing. , he works as a spotter for DGM Racing's No. 92 of Josh Williams in the NASCAR Xfinity Series.

Sorenson began competing in NASCAR in 2004 as a Busch Series driver; he has four wins in the series. His first Cup start came in 2005 before moving to a full schedule the following year.

Early career
Sorenson's career started at age six when he began racing quarter-midgets. He won the national championship in 1997. He moved up to legends cars the following year, winning 13 out of 25 races, southeastern championships and breaking track records in the process. In 1999 he won 30 out of the 50 races in which he competed. He raced in legends for the next two years and won 84 events.

In 2002, Sorenson began racing in the American Speed Association (ASA), finishing in the top-ten seven out of his eight starts. He became a full-time driver in 2003 and won the highly coveted ASA Pat Schauer Memorial Rookies of the Year award at age 17. He caught his big break by signing a driver development contract with Chip Ganassi Racing.

NASCAR
In 2004, he won his first ARCA race, at Michigan International Speedway, in the No. 77 Sherwin-Williams Dodge. He finished in the top-five in all three of his ARCA starts. Sorenson also ran in five NASCAR Busch Series events for Chip Ganassi Racing, and had three top ten finishes, and a top five, which was a fourth-place finish at Homestead.

2005
Sorenson was named the full-time driver of the No. 41 Discount Tire Company-sponsored Dodge Intrepid for Ganassi for 2005, competing for rookie of the year. He won his first Busch Series race, at Nashville Superspeedway, winning by more than 14 seconds after starting on the pole and leading 197 out of 225 laps. After the Federated Auto Parts 300, he was leading the points race by 51. Sorenson picked up another win at Gateway. He ended the season fourth in points and finished second in the rookie of the year race to Carl Edwards.

Towards the end of the season, he was signed to move up to the Nextel Cup Series to drive the No. 41 Target-sponsored car full-time. He made his Nextel Cup debut in the 2005 Bass Pro Shops MBNA 500, racing as No. 39, but was involved in a crash and finished 41st. After a failed attempt to qualify for the Dickies 500, he ran in the Ford 400 for Phoenix Racing, where he finished the race in 28th.

2006–2008

2006 brought on Sorenson's first season as a Nextel Cup Series regular, along with running a full-time driver in the Busch Series. His best finish in the 2006 Nextel Cup season was a fifth-place effort at Michigan International Speedway, and he ended the season with five top-ten finishes. He finished 24th in the 2006 points Nextel Cup standings and was fourth in the 2006 Raybestos Rookie of the Year contest with 198 points finishing behind Denny Hamlin, Martin Truex Jr., and Clint Bowyer. He also fell in the Busch Series, dropping from fourth in the standings as a 19-year-old the year before to 10th place in 2006.

Sorenson broke his 61-race winless streak in the Busch Series at Gateway International Speedway by leading 95 laps and avoiding late race cautions to win the Busch Gateway 250 in Madison, Illinois. In Cup, he had a career best finish of fourth, at the Coca-Cola 600, and later a third-place finish at his home track at Atlanta. Sorenson got his first career pole, at the Allstate 400. Sorenson became the youngest pole winner ever at Indianapolis Motor Speedway; at 21 years, 173 days old. He broke a record that stood for 72 years. It was previously held by Rex Mays, who won the pole for the Indianapolis 500 in 1935 at 22 years of age. Sorenson ended up leading 16 laps, and finishing in the fifth place, behind race winner, Tony Stewart. At the end of the 2007 season, he placed 22nd in the final standings, improving two spots from 2006 (although he actually scored fewer points than in his rookie season).

Sorenson started the 2008 season off with a fifth-place finish in the Daytona 500. This was the peak of his performances for the season. He got another top ten finish with some late race strategy in a rain shortened New Hampshire race. He was temporarily replaced by Scott Pruett at Infineon Raceway in an attempt to gain points in the owners' standings. Sorenson ran a limited 2008 NASCAR Nationwide Series competing in the Aaron's 312 at Talladega Superspeedway in the Fitz Motorsports No. 22 Arctic Ice-sponsored car.

Sorenson competed in the Missouri-Illinois Dodge Dealers 250 at Gateway International Raceway to defend his win from 2007, in the No. 40 Fastenal Chip Ganassi Racing Dodge.  He was involved in a mid-race wreck that ended his chance to defend his title. On August 26, 2008, it was announced that the 2008 season was to be Sorenson's last season with Ganassi, after signing a multi year contract with Gillett Evernham Motorsports to start the 2009 season. He ended the year 32nd in points.

2009

On January 8, 2009, Gillett Evernham Motorsports and Petty Holdings announced in principle to form a new NASCAR Sprint Cup team that will be co-owned by Richard Petty, Petty Holdings (owned by majority shareholder Boston Ventures), and Gillett Evernham Motorsports. The new car number will be No. 43 and will be driven by Sorenson. It was announced on January 19, 2009, that with the merger of Gillett Evernham Motorsports and Petty Holdings the newly formed team will be known as Richard Petty Motorsports.

Sorenson's 2009 season was wildly disappointing; he had only one top 10 (at the season-opening Daytona 500) and finished 29th in the season standings. On September 10, 2009, Richard Petty Motorsports and Yates Racing announced that they planned to merge in 2010, and Sorenson was not to be retained as part of the merger. A. J. Allmendinger took over the No. 43 following the season.

2010
Sorenson piloted the No. 32 Braun Racing Toyota Camry in a part-time schedule consisting of 23 Nationwide races for 2010. He was to share the ride with Brian Vickers, but after Vickers was diagnosed with blood clots in May and cannot race, Sorenson is to take over for the rest of Vickers' planned Nationwide starts. In mid-January, Braun Racing announced that Sorenson will drive a part-time Sprint Cup Series schedule. After failing to qualify for the Daytona 500, the team announced they will attempt the Kobalt Tools 500 in Atlanta, but decided to rather attempt the Samsung Mobile 500 in Texas, where Sorenson qualified 43rd and finished 39th. On June 16, Sorenson was hired by Team Red Bull as a substitute driver for car No. 83 and driver Brian Vickers. At the Coke Zero 400 at Daytona, Sorenson drove the No. 83 car to an eighth-place finish. It was the first top 10 for the team since Vickers was sidelined.

2011

Prior to the 2011 season, Braun Racing was acquired by Turner Motorsports and the team switched manufacturers from Toyota to Chevrolet. Sorenson remained with the team to run full-time for the Nationwide Series championship. He drove the No. 32 Dollar General Chevy and the No. 30 Rexall Chevy on occasions. He won his first road course race at Road America in Elkhart Lake, Wisconsin on his first attempt at the track. This was his first win since 2007.

On October 4, Turner Motorsports announced that Sorenson would no longer be driving the No. 32 Dollar General Chevy, and Brian Vickers would be assuming the driving duties immediately.  Turner Motorsports gave no reason for the switch; and Sorenson was third in points at the time.  Turner did acknowledge that Dollar General would not sponsor their car after 2011. Sorenson managed to pick up a last-minute ride with MacDonald Motorsports to drive their No. 82 car for the remainder of the year.

2012
In 2012, Sorenson drove the No. 52 Chevrolet for Jimmy Means in the season-opening Nationwide Series event at Daytona International Speedway. At Bristol Motor Speedway and California Speedway in March, Sorenson drove the No. 74 for Turn One Racing in the Sprint Cup Series.

Sorenson made his debut in the No. 32 team owned by Frank Stoddard for the night race at Texas Motor Speedway with sponsor from Jani-king.

Sorenson drove the No. 32 for FAS Lane Racing in select races for the 2012 Sprint Cup Season. Later in the year he attempted to qualify for the Brickyard 400 driving the No. 91 Ford for Humphrey Smith Racing, but failed to qualify for the race. He qualified for the Pennsylvania 400 the following week, making his first race in the No. 91, which had changed to Toyota.

2013

In February 2013, it was announced that Sorenson would drive full-time in the Nationwide Series in the No. 40 Chevrolet for The Motorsports Group. Following an injury to Michael Annett, Sorenson substituted for Annett in the Richard Petty Motorsports No. 43 Ford for several races.

In September, Sorenson returned to the Sprint Cup Series, replacing Scott Speed in the No. 95 Ford for Leavine Family Racing. However, he failed to secure the seat for 2014, with Leavine instead picking Michael McDowell to drive the car.

2014

In February 2014, Sorenson announced that he would be running his first full Sprint Cup Series schedule since 2009, driving the No. 36 Chevrolet for Tommy Baldwin Racing, replacing J. J. Yeley. Veteran crew chief Todd Parrott was brought in to work with Sorenson.  After struggling with limited sponsorship in the beginning of the year, the team came around during the second half of the season with additional sponsorship, recording 5 top 25s and 10 top 30s in the final 16 events of the season, with a high of 14th at Talladega. The team finished with an average finish of 29th.

2015
On February 9, 2015, Sorenson was signed by Team Xtreme Racing to compete in the Daytona 500 with sponsorship from Golden Corral, driving the No. 44 Chevy. Sorenson joined RAB Racing for the following race at Atlanta. He was also signed with Premium Motorsports after lack of sponsorship killed both of his prior teams.

2016

Sorenson attempted to make his Camping World Truck Series debut at Daytona, driving the No. 63 for MB Motorsports. Sorenson also joined Hillman Racing for the Daytona 500, driving the No. 40 Chevrolet but didn't qualify. Sorenson missed both events. Sorenson returned to Premium Motorsports, driving the No. 55 Chevrolet starting at Martinsville. Sorenson later made his Camping World Truck Series debut at Pocono, driving the No. 49 Chevrolet Silverado for Premium Motorsports where he finished 18th.

2017
Sorenson returned to Premium for the 2017 season. He failed to qualify after being (possibly) intentionally wrecked by Corey LaJoie in Can-Am Duel 1. After the race, Sorenson called the move "pretty crappy" and "moronic" and added on that LaJoie, making his first Daytona laps during the Duel, could've hurt someone, drawing comparisons to Kyle Busch's 2015 Daytona wreck, after which he missed 11 races.

After flagship driver Michael Waltrip announced that he would retire from NASCAR competition after the 2017 Daytona 500, Premium Motorsports announced that Sorenson would drive the No. 15 Toyota for the rest of the 2017 season, following Robinson's purchase of HScott Motorsports' No. 15 Chevrolet. However, Premium removed Sorenson from the 15 for Dover, replacing him with Ross Chastain. Although he did run Pocono and Michigan, he was replaced again by Kevin O'Connell at Sonoma, and D. J. Kennington at Daytona he then returned to the No. 15 until he was again replaced, this time by Gray Gaulding at Pocono. He bounced around the No. 15 and No. 55 entry's for the rest of the year.

2018–present

Sorenson drove mainly the No. 7 and No. 55 entries for Premium Motorsports throughout the year, with also driving the Bristol night race in Rick Ware Racing’s No. 51 entry. He qualified for Ross Chastain at the Michigan August race in the No. 15 when Chastain was in Mid-Ohio for the Xfinity race.

In March 2019, Sorenson joined Spire Motorsports' No. 77 for the Pennzoil 400 at Las Vegas. Throughout the 2019 season, he split the ride with various other drivers and also raced for Premium in the No. 27.

Sorenson returned to Premium's No. 27 for the 2020 Daytona 500. He made the starting lineup after finishing 18th in Duel 1 of the 2020 Bluegreen Vacations Duels.

In 2021, Sorenson became the spotter for Xfinity driver Josh Williams.

Motorsports career results

NASCAR
(key) (Bold – Pole position awarded by qualifying time. Italics – Pole position earned by points standings or practice time. * – Most laps led.)

Cup Series

Daytona 500

Xfinity Series

Camping World Truck Series

ARCA Re/Max Series
(key) (Bold – Pole position awarded by qualifying time. Italics – Pole position earned by points standings or practice time. * – Most laps led.)

 Season still in progress
 Ineligible for series points

References

External links

 

Living people
1986 births
People from Peachtree City, Georgia
Sportspeople from the Atlanta metropolitan area
Racing drivers from Atlanta
Racing drivers from Georgia (U.S. state)
NASCAR drivers
ARCA Menards Series drivers
American Speed Association drivers
American people of Danish descent
Woodward Academy alumni
Chip Ganassi Racing drivers